Philodendron angustisectum, called the cut-leaved philodendron, is a species of flowering plant in the genus Philodendron, disjunctly found in Bolivia and Colombia. It has gained the Royal Horticultural Society's Award of Garden Merit as a hothouse ornamental.

References

angustisectum
Flora of Bolivia
Flora of Colombia
Plants described in 1899